Dorymyrmex tener is a species of ant in the genus Dorymyrmex. Described by Gustav Mayr in 1868, the species is endemic to Argentina and Chile.

References

Dorymyrmex
Hymenoptera of South America
Insects described in 1868